Madhuca burckiana is a plant in the family Sapotaceae.

Description
The bark is greyish brown. Inflorescences bear up to 10 flowers.

Distribution and habitat
Madhuca burckiana is native to Sumatra, Borneo, Sulawesi, the Maluku Islands, the Philippines and New Guinea. Its habitat is mixed dipterocarp forest to  altitude.

References

burckiana
Trees of Malesia
Trees of New Guinea
Plants described in 1898